This is a list of notable faculty members and alumni of Boston University.

Notable alumni or attendees

Pulitzer Prize winners
 Stan Grossfeld (M.S. COM 1980), associate editor, Boston Globe, 1984 Pulitzer Prize
 Joseph Hallinan (B.S. COM 1984), reporter, Wall Street Journal, 1991 Pulitzer Prize
 Kenneth Irby, 1992, 1993, and 1994 Pulitzer Prizes
Stephen Kurkjian, (B.A. 1966), investigative reporter and editor, The Boston Globe, Pulitzer Prize for Local Investigative Specialized Reporting in 1972 and 1980, Pulitzer Prize for Public Service in 2003. 
 Jhumpa Lahiri (M.A. GRS 1993, M.A. UNI 1995, Ph.D. UNI 1997), 2000 Pulitzer Prize
 Patricia Maldonado, former staff writer, Miami Herald, 1999 Pulitzer Prize
 Sacha Pfeiffer, reporter, Boston Globe, 2003 Pulitzer Prize
 Michael Rezendes, reporter, Boston Globe, 2003 Pulitzer Prize
 William Sherman (reporter), New York Daily News, Pulitzer Prize, Emmy Award and Peabody Award winner
 Mark Thompson (B.S. COM 1975), senior correspondent, Time Magazine, 1985 Pulitzer Prize
 Don Van Natta Jr. (B.S. COM 1986), correspondent, New York Times, 1993, 1999, and 2002 Pulitzer Prizes
 Joan Vennochi, columnist, Boston Globe, 1980 Pulitzer Prize

Academia
 Khansaa Alshiha, academic
 Gleason Archer, Sr. (B.A. 1904, J.D. 1906), founder of Suffolk University and Suffolk University Law School
 J. Brian Atwood (B.A), dean, Hubert H. Humphrey Institute of Public Affairs, University of Minnesota
 Ben Bahan, ASL researcher, storyteller, and educator
 Richard Bohannon (PhD), Physiotherapy researcher
 Jean Briggs (M.A. 1960), anthropologist and expert on Inuit languages
 David Ciardi, (B.A. 1991), astrophysicist
 Raymond Coppinger, biologist and canine expert 
 Ruth Agnes Daly, astrophysicist
 Bogdan A. Dobrescu, scientist at Fermilab
 Jeffrey Docking, president of Adrian College
 William E. Doll Jr., educator and curriculum theorist
 Charles Wesley Emerson (School of Oratory, 1877), founder of Emerson College
 Beverly Morrison Glennon (M.A.), author, teacher, and historian
 Cynthia Gómez, psychologist known for work in public health, particularly for minority groups.
 Alan L. Gropman, professor of history and grand strategy, author and lecturer
 Gertrude Hunter,  doctor and professor of medicine, national director of health services
 Andres Jaramillo-Botero, scientist and professor, working in Computational Chemical Physics
 Theodora J. Kalikow (Ph.D. 1974), former president of the University of Maine at Farmington and the University of Southern Maine
 Philip Kasinitz, presidential professor of sociology at the CUNY Graduate Center
 Michael Katze, University of Washington microbiologist and infectious disease expert.
 Ted Landsmark, distinguished professor of Public Policy and Urban Affairs at Northeastern University
 Fred A. Leuchter, famous Holocaust denier
 Ruth Linn, former dean of the University of Haifa, Israel
 Dana Mohler-Faria, president, Bridgewater State College
 Maureen G. Mulvaney, special education teacher and college psychology instructor
 Mwalim (Morgan James Peters), director of Black Studies, associate professor of English, UMass Dartmouth
 Samuel L. Myers Sr., economist, former university president, education adviser and civil rights advocate
 John Nassivera, author, playwright and college professor
 Meyer Francis Nimkoff, sociologist
 Marie Jean Philip, ASL advocate, pioneer, and researcher
 Herbert Charles Sanborn (1873-1967), graduated in 1896; chair of the Department of Philosophy and Psychology at Vanderbilt University from 1921 to 1942.
 Jeanette Marie Sayers, proofreader at the Journal of Bone and Joint Surgery and a poetry editor for The Furnace
 Barbara Shinn-Cunningham (born 1964), professor of biomedical engineering at BU
 Richard Sugarman (born 1944), Ph.D. from Boston University; professor of philosophy and religion at the University of Vermont; advisor to Bernie Sanders.
 Donald Tomaskovic-Devey, professor of sociology at the University of Massachusetts Amherst
 Kevin J. Tracey (M.D. 1983), president, Feinstein Institute for Medical Research
 Diana Chapman Walsh (M.S., Ph.D.), president, Wellesley College
 Rollin Williams (M.S. 1949), social worker; first African American professor at the University of Connecticut

Business
 J Allard, Vice President, Microsoft
 Kamal Bahamdan (B.S. 1994), CEO, Safanad
 Nathaniel Baker (CEO), CEO, Domestic Bank
 Norman Barron, Founder, Marshalls Department Store
 Brian Bedol (COM B.A. 1980), Founder of Fusient Media Ventures; Creator of Classic Sports Network (which became ESPN Classic); founder and CEO of CSTV
 Alessandro Benetton (SMG BSB 1988), Chairman of 21 Investimenti S.p. A, and Deputy Chairman of Benetton Group
 Rocco Benetton, Former Chief Executive of the Benetton Formula One team, member of the Benetton Family
 Jan Brandt, Former CMO of AOL and Vice Chair Emeritus of America Online/Time Warner
 Jim Brett, Former CEO, J.Crew
 Jay Cashman, CEO, Jay Cashman, Inc., Boston-area construction mogul
 David K. Colapinto, Esquire, Partner, Kohn, Kohn & Colapinto, Washington, D.C.
 Allison Davis (television executive), Vice President, CBS Television
 Mickey Drexler (MBA 1968), Chairman and CEO, J. Crew
 Trung Dung, software business executive, founder of Fogbreak Software and On Display
 David Edgerton, Co-Founder of Burger King
 Kenneth Feld (SMG 1970 BSB), CEO, Ringling Brothers Barnum and Bailey Circus
 Jerald G. Fishman (MBA), CEO, Analog Devices
 Gerald L. Gitner (B.A., 1966), Former CEO of TWA and Pan American airlines, Co-founder of People Express Airline 
 Bonnie Hammer, Chairman, NBCUniversal
 Ted Harbert, President, E! Networks
 Edgar J. Helms, Founder, Goodwill Industries
 Erwin Huang,  pioneer in bringing technology to education and social enterprise
 Virginia Hubbell, writer for Lev Gleason Publications, MLJ Comics, and Dell Comics
 Ishrat Husain (PhD), 13th governor of State Bank of Pakistan
 Huh Jae-myung, CEO, Iljin Materials
 Paul Irwin, Former CEO, the Humane Society of the United States
 Shel Israel (COM, no degree), author, entrepreneur and consultant
 Bruce Karatz (B.A. 1967), CEO, KB Home
 Sherman Kwek (born 1975/76), Singaporean businessman
 Ben Sardella (born 1978), (B.A. 2000), Co-Founder and CRO of Datanyze and OutboundWorks
 Lee Suk-chae (M.S.), Former CEO, KT Corporation
 Peter J. Levine (B.S.), General Partner, Andreessen Horowitz
 Ken Lin (BA), Founder and CEO of Credit Karma
 Luca Maestri (M.S.), CFO of Apple Inc.
 Mark Manson, self-help author, blogger and entrepreneur
 Jessica McClintock (B.A. 1950), Founder, President, CEO, Jessica McClintock, Inc.
 James McGibney entrepreneur 
 James McLamore, Co-founder of Burger King
 Dirk Meyer (MBA 1993), President and COO, Advanced Micro Devices; ACM Maurice Wilkes Award winner for contributions to Alpha and x86 chip designs
 Frederick S. Pardee, Former Researcher at the RAND Corporation, real estate investor, philanthropist
 Park Yong-maan (MBA), Former Chairman and CEO, Doosan Group
 Park Jung-won (MBA), Chairman and CEO, Doosan Group
 Christine Poon (MBA 1983), Former Vice Chairman, Johnson & Johnson
 Shari Redstone (J.D.), Vice Chairman, Viacom and CBS
 Monty Sarhan, CEO, Cracked Entertainment
 Aydin Senkut, Founder & Managing Partner, Felicis Ventures
 Yat Siu, Founder of Animoca Brands
 John F. Smith Jr. (MBA 1965), honorary degree 1993, Former Chairman and CEO of General Motors
 Patrick Spain (LAW J.D. 1979), Founder of Hoover's and HighBeam Research
 Margaret Stumpp, Senior Vice President, Prudential Financial
 Tom Szkutak, CFO Amazon.com
 John Svenson, Co-Founder, The Abbey Group and Part Owner, Boston Celtics
 Nina Tassler, President, CBS Entertainment
 Robert S. Taubman, Chairman, President, and CEO, Taubman Centers
 Gerald Tsai Jr., (CAS, GRS 1949), FOrmer Chairman and CEO, Primerica
 Margaret Wallace (B.S. 1989), CEO and Co-Founder of Rebel Monkey
 Edward Zander (MBA 1975), Chairman and CEO of Motorola; Former President of Sun Microsystems

Clergy

 Martin Luther King Jr. (STH Ph.D. 1955), 1964 Nobel Peace Prize; civil rights Leader
 Andrew Z. Lopatin (B.A. CAS 1987), Orthodox Jewish rabbi
 Walter A. Maier (B.A. 1913), Lutheran theologian, professor at Concordia Seminary, and first speaker of The Lutheran Hour
 Richard Joseph Malone (Th.D. 1981), Roman Catholic Bishop of Portland from 2004–2012, and current Bishop of Buffalo
 Mihail Christodoulou Mouskos, Makarios III (no degree, STh 1948), archbishop and primate of the Cypriot Orthodox Church and first and fourth president of the Republic of Cyprus
 Woodie W. White (BST STH 1961), bishop of the United Methodist Church

International government, politics, royalty
 Faisal al-Fayez (CAS M.A.), former prime minister of Jordan
 Oscar Arias (attended, no degree), president, Costa Rica; 1987 Nobel Peace Prize
 Milind Deora (SMG BSBA '99), member of India's Parliament
 Keiko Fujimori (SMG BSB 1997), member of Peru's Congress, former first lady of Peru
 Rafic Baha El Deen Al-Hariri; board of trustees 1990–2003, named an associate founder of the university, Doctor of Laws and honorary trustee; Prime minister of Lebanon 1992–1998 and 2000–2004
 Saki Macozoma, anti-apartheid activist, ANC leader, South African businessman
 Margaret Ng (STH Ph.D.), member of Hong Kong's Legislative Council
 Fan S. Noli (Doctoratur), former Prime Minister of Albania, writer, scholar, diplomat, politician, historian, orator, and founder of the Albanian Orthodox Church
 Aamer Sarfraz, Baron Sarfraz, UK Conservative politician and businessman
 Hiroshige Seko (COM M.S. 1992), public relations advisor in the Cabinet of Japan
 Gigi Tsereteli (SPH 2005), Parliament, Georgia
 Rizal Ramli (CAS Ph.D. 1990), Coordinating Minister of Maritime Affairs, Indonesia
 Mukhriz Mahathir, former Chief Minister of Kedah
 Christopher O'Neill, businessman, husband of Princess Madeleine of Sweden, Duchess of Hälsingland and Gästrikland
Tijjani Muhammad-Bande,  (POL M.A 1981), career diplomat, President of the United Nations General Assembly
Win Gatchalian, (BS 1995), Senator of the Philippines (2016-present), Former Member of the Philippines House of Representatives from Valenzuela, Former Mayor of Valenzuela

United States government, politics

Governors
 Lincoln Almond (J.D. 1961), former Governor of Rhode Island
 John Lewis Bates (CLA A.B. 1882, LAW LL. B. 1885), former Governor of Massachusetts.
 Albert O. Brown (LL.B. 1884), former Governor of New Hampshire
 Fred H. Brown (attended LAW 1904/06, no degree), former Governor of New Hampshire, former U.S. Congressman
 Paul Dever (J.D. 1926), former Governor of Massachusetts
 Samuel D. Felker (LL.B. 1887), former Governor of New Hampshire
 Judd Gregg (J.D.), former U.S. Senator, former Governor of New Hampshire
 Bob McDonnell (MSBA 1980), former Governor of Virginia
 J. Howard McGrath (J.D. 1929), former U.S. Senator, former Governor of Rhode Island
 William Russell (LL.B. 1879), former Governor of Massachusetts.
 David I. Walsh (LL.B. 1897), former U.S. Senator, former Governor of Massachusetts

United States Senators
Senators may have served in other capacities, such as a governor. In such cases, the name is left unlinked, but the description will indicate the location of a linked entry.
 Edward Brooke III (J.D.), first African-American U.S. Senator since Reconstruction (MA), Presidential Medal of Freedom recipient
 William M. Butler (LL.B 1884), former U.S. Senator (MA)
 William Cohen (LL.B. 1965), former U.S. Secretary of Defense, former U.S. Senator, former U.S. Congressman
 J. Howard McGrath (J.D. 1929), former U.S. Senator (see Governors)
 Thomas J. McIntyre (J.D. 1940), former U.S. Senator (NH)
 Robert Upton (LL.B. 1907), former U.S. Senator (NH)
 David I. Walsh (LL.B. 1897), former U.S. Senator (see Governors)

United States House of Representatives
 

 Joseph E. Casey (JD), former U.S. Congressman (MA)
 Antonio Colorado (BS 1962), Resident Commissioner in US Congress from Puerto Rico
 Paul W. Cronin, former U.S. Congressman (MA)
 John Crawford Crosby (JD), former U.S. Congressman (MA)
 Emilio Q. Daddario (law), former U.S. Congressman (CT)
 Norman D'Amours (JD), former U.S. Congressman (NH)
 Brian J. Donnelly (BS 1970), former U.S. Congressman (MA), former US Ambassador to Trinidad and Tobago,
 Charles Douglas III (JD), former U.S. Congressman (NH)
 Forrest Goodwin (JD), former U.S. Congressman (ME)
 Daniel L. D. Granger (JD), former U.S. Congressman (RI)
 Arthur Daniel Healey (JD), former U.S. Congressman (MA), and U.S. federal judge
 Louise Day Hicks, former U.S. Congresswoman (MA)
 John Patrick Higgins (JD), former U.S. Congressman (MA)
 Joe Hoeffel (BS), former U.S. Congressman (PA)
 Barbara Jordan (JD), former U.S. Congresswoman (TX)
 Charles Joyce (Newbury Seminary, pre-1850), former U.S. Congressman (VT)
 Ambrose Kennedy (JB LAW 1906), former U.S. Congressman (RI)
 James H. Maloney (JD), former U.S. Congressman (CT)
 Jim Marshall (JD), U.S. Congressman (GA)
 Connie Morella, former U.S. Congresswoman (MD), former Maryland State Senator
 Frank Morse, former U.S. Congressman (MA)
 Henry F. Naphen (JD), former U.S. Congressman (MA)
 Alexandria Ocasio-Cortez (BA 2011), U.S. Congresswoman (NY)
 Jeremiah E. O'Connell, former U.S. Congressman (RI)
 Ernest W. Roberts (JD), former U.S. Congressman (MA)
 James Roosevelt (JD), former six term U.S. Congressman, commander of 2nd Raider Battalion of the Marine Raiders, and son of President Franklin D. Roosevelt.
 Ferdinand St. Germain (JD), former U.S. Congressman (RI)
 Charles F. Sprague (JD), former U.S. Congressman (MA)
 Robert Stafford (JD), former U.S. Congressman (VT)
 Walter Stiness (JD), former U.S. Congressman (RI)
 John Andrew Sullivan (JD), former U.S. Congressman (MA)
 Joseph Walsh (JD), former U.S. Congressman (MA)
 Edward Hills Wason (JD), former U.S. Congressman (NH)
 George Williams (JD), former U.S. Congressman (MA)

United States executive departments and agencies

 William Cohen (J.D.), former U.S. Secretary of Defense, former U.S. Senator, former U.S. Congressman
 Joshua DuBois (B.A. 2003), head of the Office of Faith Based and Neighborhood Partnerships under President Barack Obama.
 Colleen Graffy, Assistant Secretary, U.S. Department of State (P.R.)
 James Franklin Jeffrey (MBA), ambassador, U.S. Department of State
 Gary Locke (J.D. 1975), former U.S. Ambassador to China, former U.S. Secretary of Commerce and Governor of Washington (see Governors)
 Louis Wade Sullivan (MED), former U.S. Secretary of Health and Human Services

Other
 Peter W. Agnes Jr., associate justice of Massachusetts Appeals Court
 Keith B. Alexander (MBA), director, National Security Agency
 Armand Arabian, retired justice, California Supreme Court
 Polly W. Beal, former member of the Wisconsin State Assembly
 Pat Brown (MBA 2007), author, criminal profiler, TV commentator
 Shoshana S. Chatfield (BA 1987) United States Navy Admiral
 Martha Coakley (JD), former Massachusetts Attorney General
 John Couris, president and chief executive officer of Jupiter Medical Center
 Carmen Yulín Cruz (BA 1984 in Political Science, Honorary LLD 2018), member of the 28th House of Representatives of Puerto Rico (2009–2013); Mayor of San Juan, Puerto Rico (2013–2021)
 Irving Fishman, Massachusetts legislator and lawyer
 Michael F. Flaherty (JD), president, Boston City Council
Keith Francis (runner)   (MA), Senior Intelligence Analyst, ATF, World-class track athlete 
 Elizabeth Meyer Glaser (SED 1970), child advocate, AIDS activist and co-founder of the Elizabeth Glaser Pediatric AIDS Foundation
 Tipper Gore, Second Lady of the United States (1993–2001)
 Don Gorton (CAS B.A. 1982), commissioner, Commonwealth of Massachusetts Appellate Tax Board
 Russell Holmes, Massachusetts State Representative (6th Suffolk)
 Mercy B. Jackson, one of the first women to receive a Doctor of Medicine degree
 Stephen Douglas Johnson (LLM 1989), U.S. House Chief Counsel for Financial Institutions and Consumer Credit 1995–98;  White House Senior Advisor for the Office of Federal Housing Oversight 2000–03
 Takeo Kikuchi (LLB LAW 1877), one of the first Japanese to study law in the US, founder and second president of Tokyo's Chuo University
 Rikki Klieman (JD LAW 1975), attorney, TV personality, Court TV
 I Michael Leitman, (BS 1981, MD 1985), surgeon and Dean for Graduate Medical Education at Icahn School of Medicine at Mount Sinai
 Zsolt Limperger, Hungarian football player
 Barry Locke, Massachusetts Secretary of Transportation
 Ida Lorentzen, American-born Norwegian artist
 Joan M. Menard, Massachusetts State Senator
 Markos Moulitsas Zúniga (JD), political consultant
 David Mulford (MA GRS 1962), U.S. Ambassador to India
 Shannon O'Brien (JD), former Massachusetts State Treasurer
 Barbara Pariente (COM '70), Chief Justice, Florida Supreme Court (Authored the Terri Schiavo decision)
 Wilma Pastrana, First Lady of Puerto Rico since 2013
 Mark Regev (MS MET 1998), spokesman for the Israeli Prime Minister
 Robert Reimann,  retired U.S. Navy rear admiral
 Anna Howard Shaw (STH 1878, MED 1886), president, Nat'l Women's Suffrage Assn (1904–1915), first woman awarded Distinguished Service Medal
 Martha Ware, Massachusetts jurist and politician
 Sumner Whittier, former lieutenant governor of Massachusetts
 Frank J. Williams, chief justice, Rhode Island Superior Court
 John Milton Younge, Pennsylvania judge

Philippine government, politics

Philippine Senator 

Win Gatchalian, incumbent Filipino lawmaker, Senate of the Philippines (Bachelor of Science Major in Finance and Operations Management, 1995), businessman, former Valenzuela City first district representative (2001 to 2004 and 2013 to 2016), former Valenzuela City mayor (2004 to 2013)

Film, performing arts, television, radio, popular culture

 Samuel Adler, composer
 Uzo Aduba, Primetime Emmy Award-winning actress for the Netflix series Orange Is the New Black
 Aesop Rock (born Ian Bavitz) (BFA 1998), hip hop musician
 Jason Alexander (attended SFA 3 years, Hon. 1995), Tony Award-winning actor and Seinfeld character George Costanza
 Fred Allen (attended summer session), entertainer
 Tala Ashe (BFA), actress, Zari Tomaz on Legends of Tomorrow
 Howard Ashman (briefly attended), playwright (Little Shop of Horrors), Tony Award-nominated lyricist (Beauty and the Beast and The Little Mermaid)
 Abhishek Bachchan (CAS 1997, no degree), award-winning Indian actor; husband of actress Aishwarya Rai
 Joan Baez (CFA 1962, no degree), folk singer
 Edwin Barker, Principal Double Bass, Boston Symphony Orchestra
 Tobin Bell (BA), actor best known for Saw movies
 Carolyn Bessette, socialite, publicist
 Craig Bierko (BA), actor
 James Billings (CFA 1957 MM), operatic baritone, opera librettist, and opera director
 Ed Bishop, actor, Fulbright Scholar (deceased)
 Nicole Blackman, artist, poet, author, vocalist, Goth icon
 Verna Bloom (BFA 1959), actress, Medium Cool and National Lampoon's Animal House
 Jensen Buchanan, Emmy Award-nominated actress
 Calvin Burnett (MFA 1960), artist
 Raúl Castillo (CFA 1999), Actor best known for his role of Richie Donado Ventura on the HBO series Looking. 
 John Cazale, Golden Globe Award-nominated actor, best known for role as "Fredo" in The Godfather
 Michael Chiklis, Primetime Emmy Award and Golden Globe Award-winning actor
 Andy Cohen, Bravo TV executive and host
 Alexandra Cooper, radio personality, Host of "Call Her Daddy" podcast
 Casey Cott, actor, Kevin Keller on Riverdale, did not graduate
 Alexis Cruz, actor
 Olivia Culpo, Miss USA 2012 from Rhode Island, Miss Universe 2012
 David Daniels – conductor and author
 Geena Davis (SFA 1979), Academy Award-winning actress
 David de Berry, theater composer, actor
 Peter Del Vecho, Academy Award and Golden Globe Award-winning producer
 Ron Della Chiesa (BA 1959), radio personality
 Emily Deschanel (BFA), actress, Bones; sister of Zooey Deschanel
 Rocco DiSpirito, chef, restaurateur, television personality, The Restaurant
 Aubrey Dollar (no degree), actress
 Rel Dowdell, filmmaker
 Olympia Dukakis (SAR BS 1953, SFA MFA 1957), Academy Award-winning actress
 Bill Duke, actor
 Faye Dunaway, Academy Award-winning actress (BFA 1962) known for Bonnie and Clyde, The Thomas Crown Affair and Network
 Don Ellis, trumpeter and jazz composer
 Brian Fair, lead vocalist for the band Shadows Fall
 Charles Farrell (SMG 1928, no degree), film and TV actor; mayor of Palm Springs, California; has two stars on the Hollywood Walk of Fame
 Bruce Feirstein, screenwriter (three James Bond movies), and author of Real Men Don't Eat Quiche
 Jason Filardi, screenwriter, Bringing Down The House, 17 Again
 Florian David Fitz, actor
 Greg Fitzsimmons, comedian
 Dan Fogler, actor Balls of Fury and Fantastic Beasts and Where to Find Them
 Alexandra Fol, composer
 Justine Susanna Gamache (SFA BFA 1994, MFA 1999), lead singer, Freezepop
 Nina Garcia, Fashion Director of Elle Magazine, judge for Project Runway
 David Garrison (BFA), Tony award-nominated actor, Al Bundy's neighbor on Married... with Children
 Richard N. Gladstein (CGS non-degree program 1981, COM BS 1983), Academy Award-nominated film producer
 Paul Michael Glaser, actor (Starsky!) Starsky & Hutch
 Elon Gold, comedian
 Jonathan Goldsmith, actor, "The Most Interesting Man in the World"
 Ginnifer Goodwin, actress Once Upon a Time
Amber Gray (BFA 2004), Tony Award nominated actress and singer, Natasha Pierre & the Great Comet of 1812, Hadestown
 Norman Greenbaum, musician, "Spirit in the Sky"
 Mariel Hemingway, Academy Award-nominated actress, granddaughter of Ernest Hemingway
 Michelle Hurd, actress
 Eugene Izotov, Principal Oboe of the Chicago Symphony Orchestra
 Olivia Jordan, Miss World United States 2013, Top 20 at Miss World 2013. She is also Miss USA 2015 representing Oklahoma.
 Jamie Kaler (CAS BA 1987), actor, My Boys
 Myq Kaplan, comedian
 Shraddha Kapoor, Bollywood actress
 Alex Karpovsky, actor and filmmaker, Girls
 Randi Kaye, CNN reporter
 David E. Kelley (JD), television producer, husband of Michelle Pfeiffer; his father, Jack Kelley, coached BU hockey
 Paula Kelley, singer
Stephen Kijak (COM 1991), filmmaker
 Yunjin Kim, actress, Lost, Mistresses, "the Korean Julia Roberts"
 Vincent Larusso (BSB 2000 SMG), actor, The Mighty Ducks films
 James Kyson Lee, actor, Heroes
 Lee Phillip, Korean American actor
 Erica Leerhsen (BFA '98), actress
 Noah Lennox, experimental musician and founding member of the Animal Collective
 Will Lyman (SFA '71), narrator of PBS' Frontline
 Yan Luo, actress
 Tom Magliozzi (MBA, PhD), co-host of Car Talk
 Mark Manson (CAS BA 2007), self-help author and blogger.
 Rob Mariano (CAS BA 1999), better known as Boston Rob, reality TV star and husband of Amber Brkich
 Marc Maron, comedian, host of WTF with Marc Maron podcast
 Elizabeth (Sadie) Holloway Marston, co-creator of the comic book character Wonder Woman
 Megan McCormick, television travel host
 William Michals, actor and baritone singer
 Julianne Moore, Academy Award and Primetime Emmy Award-winning actress (BFA, Theatre Arts 1983)
 Russell Morash (BA '57), Emmy Award-winning producer, This Old House, New Yankee Workshop, The Victory Garden
 Mwalim, born Morgan James Peters (CAS '91, COM '93), composer, pianist, conductor, singer, playwright, director, actor
 Leonard Nimoy (no degree, school of education), (honorary doctorate in Humane Letters in 2012) Star Trek, Spock
 Kevin O'Connor (GSM MBA '99), host of This Old House
 Rosie O'Donnell (dropped out), actress, comedian
 Peter Paige, actor
 Anthony & Joseph Paratore, piano duo
 Linda Park, actress
 Ethan Phillips, actor
 PSY, born Park Jae-sang (transferred to Berklee College of Music), Korean rapper most famous for "Gangnam Style"
 Paul Rachman (CAS BA '82), film director American Hardcore, co-founder of Slamdance Film Festival
 Kim Raver (BFA), actress, Audrey Raines from 24, Grey's Anatomy
 Paul Reubens (dropped out), actor, known for Pee-wee's Playhouse
Christian Roman, animator, The Simpsons, Pixar
 Scott Rosenberg, screenwriter, Con Air, High Fidelity
 Jeffrey Ross, actor, comedian
 Patti Rothberg (no degree), singer, songwriter
 Jessica Rothe, actress (BFA 2009) from La La Land and Happy Death Day
 Anthony Ruivivar, actor
 Harold Russell, Academy Award-winning actor, former National Commander of AMVETS
Safdie brothers, Filmmakers, directors of Good Time
 Sarah Saltzberg, actress
 Lan Shui, Music Director, Singapore Symphony Orchestra
 Matt Squire (CAS 1999), platinum music producer
 Howard Stern (CGS non-degree program 1974, COM BS 1976), host of The Howard Stern Show
 Ryan Sypek, actor
 Mary Timony, indie rocker
 Marisa Tomei (attended CFA 1983, Hon. DFA 2002), Academy Award-winning actress
 Anthony Tommasini (born 1948), music critic and author
 Armand Van Helden, DJ
 Joan Wasser, indie rocker
 William Waterhouse, violinist
 Michaela Watkins, actress, Saturday Night Live
 Cynthia Watros, Primetime Emmy Award-winning actress
 Maura West, Daytime Emmy-winning soap opera actress
 Ashley Williams (BA '01), actress, Associated Press "It Girl", 2003
 Michael Williams, Academy Award-winning producer
 Alfre Woodard, Primetime Emmy Award-winning and Academy Award-nominated actress
 Katya Zamolodchikova (transferred), actor, comedian, drag queen

Journalism, non-fiction film and broadcasting

 Mike Barnicle, journalist, radio host
 Liz Cho, WABC-TV news anchor
 Christine Chubbuck, television reporter who committed suicide on live television in 1974
 Elizabeth Cohen, CNN medical correspondent
 Glenn Consor (BS 1980), sports broadcaster, Washington Wizards broadcasts, and former NCAA and pro basketball player
 Fabien Cousteau (BS 1991), aquatic filmmaker, grandson of Jacques Cousteau
 Jim Donovan (sportscaster) (BS 1978), news anchor and play-by-play announcer for the Cleveland Browns
 David Doubilet (COM 1970 BS), underwater photographer, National Geographic
 Kristin Fisher (COM), journalist and television news presenter for Fox News Channel
 Tom Fitzgerald, The Boston Globe sports journalist
 Dave Goucher (COM 1993), play-by-play broadcaster for the Vegas Golden Knights
 Edwin Grozier (1881), publisher of the Boston Post
 Eliza Putnam Heaton (1880), journalist, editor
 Erica Hill, anchor, CNN Headline News
 Jeremy Hobson, co-host, NPR's Here and Now
 Gordon Hyatt, producer and writer, CBS documentaries and public broadcasting
 Randi Kaye, CNN correspondent, AC360
 Steve Kornacki, NBC News political correspondent
Stephen Kurkjian, American journalist
 Justin Kutcher, NFL, NCAA, and MLB play-by-play broadcaster for Fox
 Michele LaFountain, anchor, ESPN SportsCenter en espanól
 Monica Larner, wine critic, The Wine Advocate
 Kristine Leahy, sports reporter, host of American Ninja Warrior
 Albert Maysles, Emmy Award-winning documentary filmmaker
 Carl Mydans (CBA BS 1930), photographic journalist with Life magazine from 1936 into the 1950s
 Joseph Nocera, columnist, New York Times
 Anne O'Hagan Shinn (AB 1890), journalist and suffragist
 Bill O'Reilly (MS '75), radio and television personality
 Anthony Radziwill, NBC anchor and reporter
 Jay Severin, commentator, politico
 Casey Sherman, bestselling author of A Rose for Mary, Black Irish, and The Finest Hours
 Bill Simmons (COM 1993 MS), podcaster, writer for ESPN's Page2
 Chet Simmons (COM 1952 MS), ABC Sports executive, NBC Sports president, first ESPN president, USFL commissioner
 Howard Stern (CGS 1974 NDP, SPC 1976 BS), shock jock, radio personality, "King of all Media"
 Sharon Tay, host, MSNBC
 Anthony Tommasini, chief music critic, New York Times
 Nina Totenberg (COM 1965), correspondent for National Public Radio
 Gary Tuchman (COM 1982), CNN national correspondent
 Dana Tyler, Emmy Award-winning news anchor
 Linda Vester, host, Fox News Channel
 Jim Vicevich, radio host of Sound Off Connecticut
 Nick Fuentes, alt right political commentator (attended.)

Literature
 Ellen Bass (1970 M.A.), poet and author
 Percy Jewett Burrell (pre-1900 B.O., School of Oratory), dramatist
 Adam Cesare, horror writer
 Hal Clement (SED 1946 M.Ed.), science fiction writer
 Nicholas Gage (DGE 1961, COM B.S. 1963, HON LtD 1985), author, Eleni, A Place For Us, Greek Fire
 Peter Guralnick (1971 M.A.), author focused on twentieth-century American popular music
 Younghill Kang, author, Guggenheim Fellow
 William Ellery Leonard (1899), poet
 Susan Miller (SSW 1979 MSS), author
 Stewart O'Nan (ENG 1983 B.S.), author
 Robert B. Parker (GRS 1957 M.A., 1971 Ph.D.), author, Spencer for Hire and other mystery novels
 Norman Vincent Peale (STh), minister, author
 John Perkins (SMG 1968 BSB), economist, author
 Kim Stanley Robinson (GRS 1975 M.A.), science fiction author
 Anne Sexton, Pulitzer Prize–winning poet (deceased)
 Lauren Slater (SED 1995 EDD [Doctor of Education]), author, psychologist
 Neal Stephenson (CLA 1981 B.A.), science fiction author
 Ada Josephine Todd (Ph.D. 1886), author and educator
 Dorothy West, author, member of Harlem Renaissance
 Bart Yates (M.M. 1988), author

Sports

 Carl Adams, current wrestling coach; 3-time NCAA All-American, two-time National Champion @ 158 lb.
 Harry Agganis, professional baseball player
 Tony Amonte, retired NHL hockey player
Tunji Awojobi (born 1973), Nigerian professional basketball player
 Shawn Bates, former NHL hockey player
 Raja Bell (transferred to Florida International University), former NBA basketball player
 Rocco Benetton, former chief executive of the Benetton Formula One team
 Cindy Blodgett, former WNBA player, assistant basketball coach
 Nick Bonino, NHL hockey player
 Billy Brooks, NFL's Buffalo Bills '93–'95
 Brett Brown, basketball coach
 Thomas Burke (Law LL.B. 1897), Olympic champion
 Butch Byrd, professional football player
 Gerardo Mauricio Chavez Montaño (CAS '02), president and general manager of Bomberos de Mexicali, Club de Basquetbol, of Mexico's CIBACOPA League
 Mickey Cochrane, Hall of Fame baseball player
 Colby Cohen, professional ice hockey player
 Glenn Consor (BS '80), sports broadcaster, radio color commentary for FM 106.7 Washington Wizards broadcasts; started four years for Rick Pitino on BU Basketball Team
 Jim Craig, 1980 U.S. Olympic Hockey Team
 Dave DeGuglielmo (SED; BS '90, EdM '91), former NCAA football coach, professional football coach
 Rick DiPietro, NHL hockey player
 Andy Dorman, Major League Soccer soccer player
 Chris Drury, retired NHL hockey player, Hobey Baker Award winner
 Tom Dwan (no degree), professional poker player
 Jack Eichel, NHL hockey player
 Michael Emenalo (CAS BA 1989), member of Nigeria's 1994 World Cup soccer team
 Mike Eruzione, Captain, 1980 U.S. Olympic Hockey Team
 Dick Farley, College Football Hall of Fame coach
 Paul Farren, former NFL player, Cleveland Browns 1983–91
 Foge Fazio, NCAA football coach, NFL football coach
 Michael Felger, sportswriter for the Boston Herald; sports radio talk show host
 Kaleigh Fratkin (born 1992), professional ice hockey player
 Tony Gaffney (born 1984), basketball player in the Israeli Basketball Premier League
 Matt Gilroy, former NHL hockey player, Hobey Baker Award winner
 Mike Grier, retired NHL hockey player
 Bill Herrion, NCAA basketball coach
 Karl Hobbs, NCAA basketball coach
 Rick Hoyt, triathlete
 Mike Jarvis, NCAA basketball coach
 Jim "Crash" Jensen, former NFL football player
 İrem Karamete (born 1993), Turkish Olympic fencer
 Robyn Kenney, Team USA field hockey
 Steven Key, WNBA's Chicago Sky head coach/general manager
 Jeffrey Lurie, owner of the Philadelphia Eagles, ex-professor, BU
 Kelvin Madzongwe, current Zimbabwean international footballer
 Charlie McAvoy, current NHL player
 Shawn McEachern, retired NHL hockey player
 John McKinlay (rower), BU crew captain, two-time Olympian, rowing, 1952 Helsinki Finland, 1956 Melbourne Australia silver medalist
 Shane McMahon, former executive vice president of Global Media, WWE
 Stephanie McMahon, former executive vice president, creative and current chief brand officer
 Freddy Meyer, retired NHL hockey player
 Kevin Murphy, 1st Team Associated Press 1-AA Football All-American, former Arena Football Player
 Jack O'Callahan, 1980 U.S. Olympic Hockey Team
 Jay Pandolfo, retired NHL hockey player
 Jack Parker, Boston University hockey coach
 Gary Plummer, NBA player
 Mary Pratt, women's professional baseball player, Rockford Peaches ("A League of Their Own")
 Tom Poti, retired NHL hockey player
 Marie-Philip Poulin, member of Canadian Women's Olympic Hockey Team; two-time Olympic gold medalist
 Ed Ronan, retired NHL hockey player
 Reggie Rucker, former NFL player
 Peter Schifrin (born 1958), Olympic fencer and sculptor
 Dave Silk, 1980 U.S. Olympic Hockey Team
 Mike Sullivan, retired NHL hockey player, NHL coach
 John Thomas, high jump world record holder
 Keith Tkachuk, retired NHL hockey player
 Jennifer Wakefield, member of Canadian Women's Olympic Hockey Team; Olympic gold medalist
 Catherine Ward, member of Canadian Women's Olympic Hockey Team; two-time Olympic gold medalist
 David Warsofsky (born 1990), NHL hockey player
 Tara Watchorn, member of Canadian Women's Olympic Hockey Team; Olympic gold medalist
Maurice Watson (born 1993), basketball player for Maccabi Rishon LeZion of the Israeli Basketball Premier League
 Ryan Whitney, former NHL hockey player
 Brandon Yip, former NHL hockey player
 Scott Young (born 1967), retired NHL player

Miscellaneous
 Warren Adelson, art dealer and author
 Myrtle Bachelder (MS 1939), chemist and Women's Army Corps officer, noted for her secret work on the Manhattan Project atomic bomb program, and for the development of techniques in the chemistry of metals
 Francis Lee Bailey (aka F. Lee Bailey) (JD '60), lawyer, graduated first in class
 Bernard Berenson (attended CLA 1883–84, no degree), prominent art historian of the early 20th century
 Carolyn Bessette-Kennedy, wife of John F. Kennedy Jr.; killed in an airplane crash on July 16, 1999
 Doris Holmes Blake, entomologist
 James Richard Cocke, M.D. (1863–1900), physician, homeopath, pioneer hypnotherapist (the first blind medical graduate)
 Richard A. Cohen, instrumental figure in conversion therapy
 Warren A. Cole, founder of Lambda Chi Alpha, one of the largest social fraternities in the United States
 Fe Del Mundo (1940), National Scientist of the Philippines; recipient of the Ramon Magsaysay Award which is considered the Nobel Prize of Asia; devised an incubator made out of bamboo, for use in rural communities without electrical power
 Charles Alexander Eastman (first named Ohiyesa), Native American physician, writer, national lecturer, and reformer
 Ivan Fisher, lawyer
 Larry Graham (JD '70), president, National Confectioners Association
 Jennifer Guidi, artist
 William W. Happ - (PhD) - Silicon transistor pioneer at Shockley Semiconductor Laboratory, and Professor at Arizona State University
 Joyce Jillson, astrologer, 20th Century Fox Studios, Reagan Administration
 Karen Kwan, figure skater
 Hadassah Lieberman, wife of U.S. Senator Joseph Lieberman
 Jenna Mourey, commonly known as Jenna Marbles, the most popular female personality on YouTube
 Frederick S. Pardee, former economics researcher at the RAND Corporation, real estate investor in Los Angeles, California, philanthropist
 Francis E. Quinlan, U.S. Marine Corps general
 Mark Rosewater, Magic: The Gathering Head Designer
 Travis Roy (COM 2000), leading activist for spinal cord injury survivors and founder of the Travis Roy Foundation
 Earle G. Shettleworth Jr., State Historian of Maine
 Cora Smith Eaton, suffragist, physician and mountaineer
 Joe Solmonese (COM 1987), president of the Human Rights Campaign
 Dawn Steel (did not graduate), first woman to run a major Hollywood studio (deceased)
 Trish Vradenburg, playwright, author, television writer, and Alzheimer's Disease advocate
 Kate Vrijmoet, artist
 Helen Magill White, first woman to earn a Ph.D.

Notable faculty members

Nobel laureates

 Saul Bellow, 1976 Nobel Prize for Literature (deceased)
 Sheldon Glashow, 1979 Nobel Prize in Physics
 Martin Luther King Jr., 1964 Nobel Peace Prize (deceased)
 Osamu Shimomura, 2008 Nobel Prize in Chemistry
 Daniel C. Tsui, 1998 Nobel Prize in Physics
 Derek Walcott, 1992 Nobel Prize for Literature; fellow, MacArthur Foundation
 Elie Wiesel, 1986 Nobel Peace Prize (deceased)

Fulbright Scholars

 Anne Donahue, Fulbright Scholar
 Robert Neffson, Fulbright Scholar

Guggenheim Fellows
 Bonnie Costello (William Fairfield Warren Distinguished Professor of English) 1990
 Theodore Antoniou (composer; professor of music) 1978
 David Aronson (Painter; emeritus professor of Art) 1960
 Saul Bellow (Novelist; University Professor) 1948 and 1955
 Alicia Borinsky (professor of Latin American and comparative literature), 2001 Latin American and Caribbean Fellow
 Robert V. Bruce (professor emeritus of History) 1957
 Charles Capper (professor of history) 1994
 Robert Dallek (professor of history) 1973
 Norman Dello Joio (composer; university professor and professor emeritus of music) 1944 and 1945
 Leslie D. Epstein (director, Creative Writing Program) 1977
 Thomas F. Glick (professor of history) 1987
 Gennady Gorelik (research fellow, Center for Philosophy and History of Science) 1995 US and Canadian Fellow
 Jaakko Hintikka (professor of philosophy) 1987
 Caroline A. Jones (associate professor of Art History) 1999 US and Canadian Fellow
 Howard Clark Kee (William Goodwin Aurelio Professor Emeritus of Biblical Studies) 1966
 Nancy Kopell (professor of mathematics) 1984
 Leonid A. Levin (professor of computer science) 1993
 Ralph Lombreglia (Instructor in Creative Writing) 1996 US and Canadian Fellow
 Debraj Ray (former professor of economics) 1997 US and Canadian Fellow
 Maureen Raymo (research associate professor of earth sciences) 2003 US and Canadian Fellow
 Abner Shimony (emeritus professor of philosophy and physics) 1972 US and Canadian Fellow
 Murad Taqqu (professor of mathematics) 1987
Ibram X. Kendi (author, director of Center for Antiracist Research) 2019
 William Giraldi (author, Instructor in Writing) 2021
 Josephine Halvorson (College of Fine Arts professor of art and chair of graduate studies in painting) 2021

MacArthur Fellows
 Jim Collins, fellow, MacArthur Foundation, professor of biomedical engineering
 Nancy Kopell, fellow, MacArthur Foundation, professor of mathematics

Rhodes Scholars
 Jim Collins, Rhodes Scholar, professor of biomedical engineering
 Michael Hasselmo, Rhodes Scholar, professor of psychology
 Jon Westling, Rhodes Scholar, former president of Boston University

Film, performing arts, television, radio
 Julia Child, cooking show host (deceased)
 Harold Dorschug, radio engineer, former faculty member (deceased)
 Simon Estes, operatic bass-baritone
 Mark Fergus, screenwriter, director
 Lukas Foss, composer and conductor (deceased)
 Leslie Parnas, cellist (deceased)
 Sumner Redstone, media mogul
 Roman Totenberg, violinist (deceased)
 Paul Ulanowsky, pianist
 Roger Voisin, principal trumpet; Boston Symphony Orchestra (deceased)
 Bob Zelnick, former ABC News correspondent, author

Other

 Loretta Lees, Urban Geographer and Director of the Initiative on Cities
 Isaac Asimov, author, best known for his work in writing science and science fiction (deceased)
 Warren Ault, Huntington professor of history
 Andrew Bacevich, historian, writer
 Alexander Graham Bell, professor, inventor of the telephone (deceased)
 Peter L. Berger, contemporary sociologist and theologian (deceased)
 Zvi Bodie, professor
 Belinda Borrelli, professor and director of the Center for Behavioral Science Research.
 Borden Parker Bowne, professor of philosophy, 1876–1910
 Gerald Warner Brace, professor of English; writer known for his novels, fiction and literary works
 Lewis E. Braverman, chief of endocrinology 1999-2017
 Robert A. Brown, fellow, American Academy of Arts and Sciences; National Academy of Sciences, current Boston University president
 Robert V. Bruce, winner of the 1988 Pulitzer Prize for History (deceased)
 Kathryn Burak, director of the Writing Program in the College of Communications
 Caroline Walker Bynum, fellow, American Academy of Arts and Sciences
 Milič Čapek (1909–1997), philosopher
 Ray Carney, film theorist
 Aram Chobanian, Lifetime Achievement Award, American Heart Association, former Boston University president
 John T. Clarke, professor of astronomy
 Robert Dallek, author, historian, Bancroft Prize winner
 Roberta L. DeBiasi, M.D., head of the Division of Pediatric Diseases at Children's National Hospital
 Charles DeLisi, Presidential Citizens Medal; Smithsonian Platinum Technology 21st Century Pioneer Partnership Laureate; Arthur G B Metcalf Professor of Science and Engineering
 Mildred S. Dresselhaus, fellow, American Academy of Arts and Sciences; National Academy of Sciences; National Academy of Engineering
 Nancy Halliday Ely-Raphel, former associate dean, Boston University School of Law
 Leslie Epstein
 Henry Giroux, founding theorist of critical pedagogy in the United States
Robert Hess (1938-1994), President of Brooklyn College
 Geoffrey Hill, fellow, American Academy of Arts and Sciences
Gene Andrew Jarrett, professor of English and African American studies
 Ha Jin, author, National Book Award winner, Faulkner Award winner, Hemingway Award winner
 Sir Hans Kornberg, fellow, American Academy of Arts and Sciences; National Academy of Sciences
 Thomas Kunz, fellow, American Academy of Arts and Sciences
 Richard Landes, historian, director of the Center for Millennial Studies
 Calvin B. T. Lee, dean of the College of Liberal Arts 1968–1970, acting president 1970–1971, executive vice president 1971–1971
 Leonid Levin, co-discoverer of NP-completeness
 Robert J. McShea
 Adil Najam, dean, Frederick S. Pardee School of Global Studies
 S. Hamid Nawab, professor of electrical and computer engineering, co-author of Signals and Systems (1997), published by Pearson (Prentice Hall).
 Father Norman O'Connor (1921–2003), former BU Catholic Chaplain, jazz aficionado, writer, radio and TV show host
 Patrice Oppliger, assistant professor of Communication and media consultant on popular culture
 Robert Pinsky, former U.S. Poet Laureate
 Anne Sexton, poet (deceased)
 Batu Siharulidze, prominent artist, known for his figurative sculptures
 John Silber, former president
 Whitney Smith, vexillologist
 Susanne Sreedhar, assistant professor of philosophy
 Charles R Stith, US Ambassador to Tanzania 1998–2001
 Merlin Swartz, scholar of religion
 Shanghua Teng, professor of computer science at Boston University and winner of Gödel Prize
 Shari Thurer, adjunct associate professor in psychology 
 Georgia Warnke, distinguished professor of philosophy and the director of the Center for Ideas & Society at the University of California, Riverside
 Rosanna Warren, fellow, American Academy of Arts and Sciences
 David Wiggins, fellow, American Academy of Arts and Sciences
 Howard Zinn, historian, political activist, best selling author
 Markos Moulitsas Zuniga, founder and main author of Daily Kos

References

Boston University people
Boston University
Boston University